Edward F. Davis III (born July 31, 1956) is the former police commissioner of the Boston Police Department, having served from 2006 to 2013, including during the Boston Marathon bombing. Following his resignation from the police, Davis has been the security analyst for WBZ-TV in Boston. He is the founder and CEO of Edward Davis, LLC Security and Management Consulting.

Early life
Davis graduated from Bishop Guertin High School in Nashua, New Hampshire in 1974. He received a Bachelor of Science in  criminal justice in 1986 at Southern New Hampshire University. He received a Master of Science in criminal justice in 1990 at Anna Maria College. Later he attended the John F. Kennedy School of Government's Program for Senior Government Executives and the Law Enforcement Executive Development Association program at the FBI Academy in Quantico, Virginia.

Law enforcement career

Lowell Police Department
Davis served on the Lowell Police Department from 1978 to 2006 when he was appointed Commissioner of the Boston Police Department. He held the positions of beat cop, Detective (1982–1984), Detective Sergeant (1984–1986) and Detective Lieutenant (1986–1992), before being promoted to Captain of the Narcotics and Organized Crime Unit in 1992.

He was named Superintendent of Police, the highest-ranking officer in the Lowell Police Department in 1994. From 1994–99, he reduced the crime rate in Lowell quicker than any other American city with over 100,000 residents.

Boston Police Department
Davis was appointed the commissioner of the Boston Police Department on October 11, 2006.

Davis is well known for his leadership during the Boston Marathon bombing and subsequent manhunt. His actions during these events were dramatized in the film Patriots Day, in which he was portrayed by John Goodman.

On September 22, 2013, Davis announced his resignation from the Boston Police Department. He planned to become a visiting fellow at Harvard's Kennedy School of Government and also assist with a local non-profit helping offenders return to society. His final day as commissioner was November 1, 2013.

Later involvement
In 2022, Davis served on a panel appointed by Boston Mayor Michelle Wu to aid in the search for a commissioner of the Boston Police Department.

Personal
Davis was born and raised in Lowell, Massachusetts and remains a resident of his hometown with his wife Jane. Davis and his wife have three children (Edward, Kaitlyn and Phillip).

References

1956 births
Living people
Anna Maria College alumni
Commissioners of the Boston Police Department
People from Lowell, Massachusetts
Southern New Hampshire University alumni
Bishop Guertin High School alumni